Gece Yolculuğu is a 1987 Turkish drama film, written, co-produced, and directed by Ömer Kavur, featuring Aytaç Arman as a screenwriter traveling with his business partner around the Turkish and Greek countryside in search of a filming location which will inspire him. The film premiered in the Un Certain Regard section at the 41st Cannes Film Festival and was screened in competition at the 25th Antalya Golden Orange Film Festival, where it won Golden Oranges for Best Film, Best Director, Best Actor, and Best Cinematography.

Cast
 Aytaç Arman as Ali
 Macit Koper as Yavuz
 Sahika Tekand
 Arslan Kacar
 Orhan Çagman
 Nurseli İdiz
 Osman Alyanak

References

External links
 

1987 films
1987 drama films
Turkish drama films
1980s Turkish-language films
Films set in Greece
Films set in Turkey
Films shot in Greece
Films shot in Turkey
Films directed by Ömer Kavur
Golden Orange Award for Best Film winners
Films scored by Attila Özdemiroğlu